The Master and the Musician is the title of the first entirely instrumental album by guitarist Phil Keaggy, released in 1978, on NewSong Records. It was later reissued, with a bonus track, on Myrrh Records in 1989.

Track listing
All songs written by Phil Keaggy, unless otherwise noted.

Side one
 "Pilgrim's Flight"  – 2:22
 "Agora (The Marketplace)"  – 3:26
 "The Castle's Call"  – 0:47
 "Wedding in the Country Manor"  – 3:20
 "Suite of Reflections"  – 5:45
 "Golden Halls"  – 5:13
 "Mouthpiece"  – 1:18
 "Follow Me Up"  – 4:05
 "Jungle Pleasures"  – 0:55
 "Deep Calls Unto Deep"  – 3:52
 "Medley: Evensong / Twighlight / Forever Joy"  – 7:05
 "The High and Exalted One"  – 1:48
 "Epilogue / Amazing Grace" (bonus track on 1989 reissue)  – 8:56

Personnel
Phil Keaggy: classic, electric, and Ebow guitars, bass, ARP bass synthesizer, drums and percussion, voices
Bernadette Keaggy: voices
Tom Baker: bass on "Agora (The Marketplace)"
Nick Kircher: recorders and oboe on "Deep Calls Unto Deep"
Philip Kimbrough: recorders on "Medley"
Peter Pfiefer: percussion on "Epilogue"
Jim Issacs: oboe on "Epilogue"
Tom Fryer: keyboards on "Agora", "Suite", "Golden Halls", and "The High and Exalted One"
Susan Kircher: flute on "The Castle's Call", and "Wedding in the Country Manor"

Production notes
Produced and arranged by Phil Keaggy
Engineered by Mal Davis and Garry Hedden
Recorded June–August 1978 at Hedden West Studio, Schaumburg, Illinois

References 

1978 albums
Instrumental albums
Phil Keaggy albums